Santa Cruz Breakwater Lighthouse, is a lighthouse in California, United States, in the Santa Cruz Small Craft Harbor in Santa Cruz, California.

The lighthouse is known as Walton Lighthouse because Charles Walton, a local businessman, contributed a significant part of the construction cost in memory of his late brother Derek Walton, who was a merchant seaman. The Walton lighthouse was built in 2001 with donations including $60,000 from Charles Walton.

See also

 List of lighthouses in the United States

References

Lighthouses in California
Lighthouses completed in 2001
2001 establishments in California
Transportation buildings and structures in Santa Cruz County, California
Santa Cruz, California